Frontiers: A Journal of Women Studies is a triannual peer-reviewed academic journal which figures among the earliest publications in the field of feminist and gender studies in the United States. First published in 1975, at the University of Colorado, Boulder, Frontiers takes pride in its extensive, interdisciplinary agenda concerned with the intersections of the different systems of oppression that produce and reproduce social inequalities and injustices. From 2012  through spring 2017 the journal was edited at Ohio State University, with  Guisela Latorre and Judy Tzu-Chun Wu serving as editors-in-chief. As of July 2017 its editorial team is based at the University of Utah's new School for Cultural and Social Transformation, and the editors are Wanda S. Pillow, Kimberly M. Jew, and Cindy Cruz. The aim of the publication is to promote the works of feminist thinkers and theorists.

Abstracting and indexing 
The journal is abstracted and indexed in Social Sciences Citation Index and Current Contents/Social & Behavioral Sciences. According to the Journal Citation Reports, the journal has a 2015 impact factor of 0.214, ranking it 37th out of 40 journals in the category "Women's Studies".

See also 
 List of women's studies journals
 Feminist Review
 Feminist Studies
 Signs (journal)

References

External links 
 

Academic journals published by university presses
English-language journals
University of Nebraska System
Publications established in 1975
Triannual journals
Women's studies journals
Ohio State University